A pig roast or hog roast is an event or gathering which involves the barbecuing of a whole pig. 

Pig roasts, under a variety of names, are a common traditional celebration event in many places including the Philippines, Puerto Rico and Cuba. It is also popular in the United States, especially in the state of Hawaii (a luau)  and in the Southern United States (pig pickin'). In Southeast Asia, a pig roast is a staple among the Buddhist, and Christian communities, notably among Catholic Filipinos and Hindu Balinese people, or Buddhist Chinese people.

Traditions 

The tradition of the hog roast goes back millennia and is found in many cultures. There are numerous ways to roast pork, including open fire rotisserie style roasting, and "caja china" style box grilling. Many families traditionally have a pig roast for Thanksgiving or Christmas. In Miami and other areas with large Cuban, Puerto Rican, Honduran or other Caribbean populations pig roasts are often held on Christmas Eve by families and friends, whereas families from Hawaii often hold a roast on Memorial Day.

In various Chinese communities (especially in Southern China), a roast suckling pig is purchased for special family occasions, business launches, or as a ritualistic spiritual offering. For example, one tradition is to offer one or several whole roast suckling pigs to the Jade Emperor to celebrate a Chinese film's opening. The pig is sacrificed to ward off evils and in prayer for the film's success. One garnish used to make the dish look more appealing is a circular slice of pineapple and cherry, and is often placed in a red box for luck.

Indonesia
In Indonesia, roast pig is called babi guling, babi putar, babi panggang or babi bakar; it is predominantly found in non-Muslim majority regions, such as Hindu Bali and Christian Batak lands in North Sumatra, the Minahasa people of North Sulawesi, Toraja in South Sulawesi, Papua, and also among Chinese Indonesians. In Bali, babi guling is usually served with lawar and steamed rice; it is a popular dish in Balinese restaurants and warungs. In the Batak people's tradition, babi guling is a prerequisite in wedding offerings by the bride's family. In Papua, pigs and yams are roasted in heated stones placed in a hole dug in the ground and covered with leaves; this cooking method is called bakar batu (burning the stone), and it is an important cultural and social event among Papuan people.

Philippines

Similarly in the Philippines, also a former Spanish colony, the lechon, a pork dish, is eaten. It is referred to as lechon baboy or litson baboy, and is one of the main highlights at celebratory occasions and fiestas.

Puerto Rico & Cuba
Pig roast (lechon asado) is very popular in many former Spanish colonies; it is a part of Puerto Rico's national dish and is usually served with arroz con gandules. In Puerto Rico & Cuba pig roasts occur year-round, but are most common at New Year's Eve and especially Christmas; occasionally if a family has moved to the United States, they will take the recipe with them and use it during the summer. In the Dominican Republic, puerco a la puya is a traditional part of the Christmas Eve meal.
In Spain, the locals call this a suckling pig or a lechon asado. Hog roasts are becoming more popular across Spain and more so in Southern Spain due to the ex-pat community, as well as some of Spain's former colonies.

United Kingdom
In the UK, the tradition of pig roasting, more commonly known in the UK as a "hog roast", is popular on many occasions, particularly parties and celebrations. It is usually an outdoor event, and a staple meal at many show events. The tradition is to roast either on a spit, turning the pig under a flame, or in a large oven in a roasting pan; roasting pigs around 130 lbs (60 kg) in weight are common in the UK. The pig is normally roasted in a propane gas machine. The pig's skin is scored with a sharp blade and covered in water and salt to make the crackling. In ancient times, going all the way back to the Saxons, roasting a wild boar was often the centerpiece of a meal at Yuletide, with Yule being Freya's feast. The head was often the greatest delicacy, as evidenced by the survival of the Boar's Head Carol.

United States

In the United States, roasting a whole pig or a feral hog has been a tradition for over two hundred years, especially in the Southern United States where it is closely linked to barbecue.  From Virginia south to Florida Panhandle. and west to the Mississippi River south to Louisiana, the  favored meat in Southern, Cajun, Appalachian, and Creole cooking is pork and has been since colonial times: pigs did not require any special handling or maintenance and could be sent off into the woods and rounded up again when supplies ran low, and thus were the prime choice for meat for small farmers and plantation owners, and for men living up in the mountains, the tradition was to drive their pigs to market every fall, fattening them up on the many nuts and acorns that proliferated in the area.  George Washington even mentions attending a barbecue in his journal on August 4, 1769, and the records of Mount Vernon note a smokehouse on the premises. Like many plantation owners, he raised several pigs for slaughter in November and once his slaves had finished curing the meat into ham and bacon, they would pit roast some whole pigs over hot coals as a treat. Outside of the English-speaking states of the South, francophone Cajuns, then as now, had Cochon de lait as a traditional dish for the gathering of their large families.

Cooking 

A hog/pig, often around 80–120 pounds (35 to 45 kg) dressed weight, is split in half and spread onto a large charcoal or propane grill. The styles of grills used are as varied as the methods of producing them; some are homemade while others are custom made.

In a Hawaii-style pig roast, a large pit is typically dug into the ground and lined with banana leaves, as lava rocks are heated over an open flame until they are very hot. The heated rocks are placed into the pit, and a seasoned pig is placed inside and covered with additional banana leaves, which serve as insulation and for flavor.

In an American Cuban-style pig roast, the "caja china" is the most commercially popular method by which to roast a whole pig. In its more traditional form, a roasting box is commonly fashioned above ground out of concrete blocks and steel mesh. Another popular method is to use a pig roasting box, the oldest and best known brand of which is "La Caja China." The cooking process is communal and usually done by men; the host is helped by friends or family. It usually takes four to eight hours to cook the pig completely; the pig is often started "meat-side" down, and then is flipped one time once the hog has stopped dripping rendered fat. When the cooking is complete, the meat should ideally be tender to the point of falling off of the bone. The meat is then either chopped or pulled or is picked off the roasted pig by the guests.

In the Philippines, the pig is typically stuffed with spices, placed on a bamboo spit, and roasted over hot coals.

In Puerto Rico, pig roast is prepared in adobo mojado (wet seasoning) containing crushed garlic, black pepper, salt, orégano brujo, olive oil, and wine vinegar.

See also

 Siu yuk
 List of pork dishes
 List of cooking techniques
 List of spit-roasted foods

References 

Grilled skewers
Eating parties
Christmas food
Spit-cooked foods
World cuisine
Pork